Gol Kan may refer to:
 Gol Kan, Sistan and Baluchestan
 Gol Kan, South Khorasan